Wang Ching (Chinese: 王淨; Pe̍h-ōe-jī: Ông Chēng; pinyin: Wáng Jìng; born 7 February 1998) is a Taiwanese actress and writer, better known as Gingle. Rapidly gaining reputition from her work across various films and television productions, she already established herself as one of Taiwan's highest-paid actresses at the age of 24. Gingle began her acting career in 2017 with director Lien Yi-chi offering Gingle her first role in his film All Because of Love. Her breakthrough came in 2019 with the psychological horror film Detention, directed by John Hsu. For her performance in the film, she won Best Actress at the 22nd Taipei Film Awards and was nominated for the Best Leading Actress at the 56th Golden Horse Awards. Her burgeoning career has earned her numerous accolades; she received nominations for the Golden Bell Awards in 2019 and the Golden Horse Awards in 2019 and 2021. Besides her acting career, she is also an author of two books, Bale Love (2013) and Cockroach Philosophy (2015). Gingle is primarily known for her fine acting and is appreciated by many of her colleagues and movie directors. Also, she showed her talent for singing at the age of 17, which gained her lots of attention and generous applause. Her enthusiasm for writing also leads to her image as a hipster and art enthusiast. Her background gives her an enormous influence on her acting style. Whether it is her parents' divorce or her role as a writer, Gingle Wang has overcome the difficulties and cultivated over-age and mature acting skills.

Early life and education 
Gingle Wang was born on February 7, 1998, in Beitou District, Taipei, Taiwan. Raised in a single-parent household, she lived with her mother until junior high school, when she separated from her mother to study abroad. Unlike most teenagers who experienced the rebellious stage, Gingle seized every chance to reunite with her family, cherished her time with her mother, and even tattooed her mother's name on her arm. She would not hide her mother's love in her heart and would tell her directly, "You work hard, and I love you very much." As for her father, Gingle admitted that she had barely any impression of him. In 2009, Wang Ching entered Taipei Municipal Tian-Mu Junior High School but went to Flintridge Sacred Heart Academy in the United States the following year. Ridiculed as a "fat Asain girl" and a nerd by her classmates, she decided to transform her image. Despite her limited experience with softball, Gingle joined the softball team and practiced hard to become one of the best players on the team. She then impressed her teammates, who used to bully her.

At 15, Gingle published her debut novel Bale Love under the pen name Jun Jun. Studying alone in the U.S., writing helped her deal with her hardships. Additionally, she hoped her mother could recover from her divorce through her novel, which featured a protagonist that, much like Gingle's mother, was a divorced woman. Two years later, second novel, Cockroach Philosophy, was planned to be adopted into a TV drama. In 2016, she returned to Taiwan from the United States and was admitted to Temple University, Japan Campus in 2017, where she majored in political science.

Acting career 
Gingle made her silver-screen debut in 2017 in All because of love. Nominated for the 54th Golden Bell Awards for Best Supporting Actress in a Miniseries or TV Film, her first significant television role was portraying the character of Molly Lin in episodes 5 and 6 of the television series On Children. In 2019, she firmly established herself as one of the best actresses in the industry for her role as Fang Ray Shin, a high school student, in the blockbuster film Detention.

2015 
At age 17, Gingle gained attention for her covers on Tu Chin Liang's Taxi KTV, where the driver often interacts with his passengers through the KTV equipment installed on the vehicle, and in this case, uploaded Gingle's covers to his personal YouTube channel after her ride. Her performance in the cover videos earned her plentiful praise and established her notoriety, which contributed to her securing her role in All because of love, her silver screen debut.

2017 
She was offered her first role by director Lien Yi-chi in his film All because of love, in which she played the female lead Hung Man-li, who found herself caught in an intertwined relationship between the male leads.

2018 
Following her 2017 film debut that grossed NT$14 million domestically, she was cast as the female lead of the hundred-million film The Outsiders, based on the TV series of the same name that set viewing records in 2004. Her role as Pei Yuyan impressed the audience and critics, and her eloquent delivery and impressionable body language set her apart from her colleagues. She also made appearances as the lead female in the TV series On Children and Possession as Molly Lin and Wang Chiaying respectively. Her infectious interpretation of Molly Lin earned her a nomination for the 54th Golden Bell Awards for Best Supporting Actress in a Miniseries or TV Film. Gingle was deeply invested in her role as Molly Lin, in some cases engaging in discussions with the director about her lines; feeling like she resonated on a personal level with the character, three months elapsed before she was able to recover from the unfortunate ending Molly Lin suffered in the series.

2019 
Gingle's breakthrough role came in John Hsu's 2019 film Detention, which was based on the video game of the same name. The video game was immensely successful as within a week of its release, Detention became the third bestselling game on Steam. Matching the virality of its inspiration, this supernatural psychological horror film also turned out to be a massive box office success, topping the charts for the highest-grossing domestic films of 2019 in Taiwan. The film featured her as high school senior Fang Ray Shin, the heroine protagonist of the story; Set in the authoritarian "White Terror" chapter of Taiwanese history, the protagonists, Fang (Gingle) and Wei (Tseng Ching-hua), are caught in a tragic story in a tragic time. For her excellent performance, Gingle was nominated for the Best leading actress at the 56th Golden Horse Awards and won Best Actress at the 22nd Taipei Film Awards. Much like 2018, Gingle continued to star in television series, playing a leading role in Yuan Chengmei in the 15-part series Brave to Love. Later that same year, she appeared as Yin Yue, a supporting actress in the 10-episode series Yong-jiu Grocery Store.

2021 
Gingle's next film came in 2021, as the pandemic ravaged Taiwan's domestic film industry in 2020 and led to postponement in production or release. She appeared in a supporting role as Wang Ting in Plurality, directed by Aozaru Shiao. Later the same year, Chung Mong-Hong cast Gingle, alongside Alyssa Chia, in female lead roles as the mother-daughter duo in The Falls before he even met the pair, as he thought the impressionable looks of Gingle and Alyssa could help the audience connect to the characters. Her emotionally rich and contagious performance in The Falls captured the hearts and imagination of viewers and producers alike, as she was nominated for the Best leading actress at the 58th Golden Horse Awards, firmly establishing her as a future star in the film industry. The movie also turned out to be critically acclaimed as it was nominated for or won nearly a dozen separate awards at the 58th Golden Horse Awards, including winning the Best Feature Film. The film also garnered international attention at the Venice International Film Festival and the New Mexico Critics Awards, winning Best Foreign-Language Film in the latter. Gingle worked with renowned director Giddens Ko for the first time in the fantasy romance Till We Meet Again, in which she portrays Pinky, a dissatisfied high school girl turned trainee love god, alongside her divine partner Ah Lun, played by Kai Ko. The film was a resounding commercial success, raking in a quarter billion NT dollars at the domestic box office alone. Winning three of eleven nominations, Till We Meet Again also did well at the 58th Golden Horse Awards, though Gingle's major supporting role did not gain as much traction this time. During the promotion for the film, Gingle reassessed her talents in dancing, stating her interest in taking part in a musical in the future. On October 22, More Than Blue: The Series was released worldwide on Netflix. The ten-part series, one year in the making, featured Gingle as Cream, an orphaned high school girl, and follows her adventures with K, played by Fandy Fan, in an emotional rollercoaster ride. The three-part television series Light the Night saw Gingle make special appearances in part two (released December 30, 2021) and three (released March 18, 2022) of the work, playing a younger Rose, the female protagonist of the series. Gingle was widely praised for her role upon the series' release, notable names that publicly displayed their support and admiration included director Chu Yu-ning, the executive producer of The Falls, among others.

Reception and public image 
Gingle Wang has been described by the Bazaar Magazine as one of the most celebrated actresses of the newborn generation in Taiwan's performing arts. Besides, many of her fans even regarded her as the successor of Zhou Xun, one of the most well-known Chinese actresses. Also, Gingle has won The Best Actress of Taipei Film Awards in 2020 and was shortlisted in many other Awards. Her main genres included romance, horror, thriller, and fantasy. Romance movies, for example, The Outsiders, More Than Blue: The Series, and All Because Of Love. As for the horror movie, she starred in Detention. The thriller movie is The Falls, and the fantasy movie is Till We Meet Again. Gingle is particularly known for being the main actress in Detention. Her popularity increased rapidly after this film and she has been engaged in more well-known film and television works since then.

Some comments have been given by the movie directors and Gingle's colleagues. As one of her friends and colleagues, Mu Lee says Gingle is a kind-hearted and strong-minded person. Mu Lee regarded herself as a relatively decisive person, while Gingle thought more about others and whether things could be done better. "The daughter in the movie really makes me feel distressed. Gingle's eyes-expressions give me a lot of ideas", says Alyssa Chia, who starred in The Falls with Gingle. Director Chung Mong-Hong also speaks highly of Gingle, "Gingle's outstanding is just like a stroke of luck. I'm so lucky to have her."

An interest in writing has led Gingle to the image of a hipster and art enthusiast. She has two of her books. One is Bale Love, which is her first published work at the age of 15. Another one is Cockroach Philosophy. Its copyright was bought by Chu Yu-Ning, the producer of the movie The Falls, and may be remade into a movie. Despite the image of being an actress and a writer, she's also good at singing. Gingle gained attention by uploading a video recording of her song covers in 2015, which earned her abundant applause and led to her silver-screen debut. She once mentioned in an interview, "Originally, I thought that I would debut as a singer, but unexpectedly I became an actress." Regarding singing as a way to relieve pressure, she would love to show different aspects of herself to her fans in the future.

Acting style 
Gingle Wang accidentally started her acting career when trying to find a part-time job. Moreover, she had never thought of herself as an actress. After the audition, her potential for acting was discovered by the director Chung Mong-Hong. Although Gingle was afraid of getting others' attention, only through acting could she be someone else, letting her enjoy the pleasure of being in the spotlight. Moreover, the charm of acting is that she can experience things that couldn't be experienced in daily life, which caused her to her acting career.

As a non-professional actress at that time, Gingle struggled to withdraw herself from the characters after the performance. Saoirse Ronan, as her role model regarding acting skills, Gingle adores not only her natural acting but also her courage to be herself. Gingle has been saying farewell to people and all kinds of things since a very young age, making her feel that she was not attached to anything. Thus, a character from movies is like a piece of driftwood to define herself temporarily. To let go of the connections to the characters and find herself back again after the end of each work, she uses the hashtag "Location & Character and Me" on her social media page to keep a collection of goodbye letters to the roles she has played.

Her background gives her an enormous influence on her acting style. In middle school, due to her parents' divorce, Gingle decided to start a new life by studying in the United States. The experience made her cultivate over-age and mature acting skills. For instance, in the film The Falls, due to the requirement of wearing a mask, Gingle worried she couldn't express herself only through her eyes and eyebrows. However, she overcame the difficulties and reckoned that wearing a mask fit the movie's atmosphere. With her unique interpretation of the role and her perfect co-working with the other actress, Gingle's performance got her nominated for the Golden Horse Awards.

Furthermore, her role as a writer makes Gingle sensitive to words. Every time she finishes the description of a new play, she immediately gets a clear image of directing, acting, and expressing the characters. Take the film, Detention, which is adapted from a video game, for example. Since a video game character can't express emotions or abstract concepts fully, an actor/actress needs to amend these restrictions and provide more comprehensive feelings to audiences when turning into a movie. Gingle's acting has successfully added some new flavors to the original video game character, and gave the audience a whole new experience.

Personal life 
Gingle Wang has four tattoos with unique meanings separately. Since Gingle loves and respects her sister much, she has her sister's name, "Maple," on her left arm. The second one is "Carpe diem," meaning seize the day. "Psalm 90:9" is her favorite tattoo, coming from the Bible, " All our days pass away under your wrath; we finish our years with a moan." She always tells herself, " No matter what you are suffering or going through something miserable, try to change the mindset and hang on. After all, it's just a sigh, and time passes." The last one is a unique and meaningful rose by her mother's English name on her right upper arm. Roses are her mother's favorite, and they remind Gingle of her beloved mom's brightness and calmness.

Gingle is fond of reading, writing novels, and watching history and culture series. Her favorite female writers are Echo Chan(三毛) and Xi Murong(席慕蓉). "My writing habit is mainly influenced by my mother. My mother contributed considerably to newspapers and magazines when she was young, and then she would preserve those article clippings in the albums. I want to follow my mom's steps so my writings can be published and available to everyone."

In addition, she also loves photography, exploring nature, and traveling around. Visiting various places makes her life fulfilling and colorful. When asked what she would do if there were a chance to take a long break in the future, she replied, "I would like to study photography abroad." Her works are often appreciated, and she thinks picturing down the moments with the camera's shutter is the best way to enjoy life.

Filmography

Film

Television series

Bibliography

Awards and nominations

References

External links 

 

Living people
21st-century Taiwanese actresses
21st-century Taiwanese women writers
1998 births
Actresses from Taipei
Writers from Taipei